Cardiff City Football Club, a professional association football club based in Cardiff, Wales, was founded in 1899 as Riverside A.F.C. by members of Riverside Cricket Club. The club's first year was made up of friendlies before they were admitted to the Cardiff & District League in 1900 and later the South Wales Amateur League in 1907. The following year, the club were granted permission to adopt the name Cardiff City, having been denied the previous year as they were deemed not to be playing at a high enough level, and moved into the English football league system for the first time by joining Division Two of the Southern Football League. They won promotion to Division One in the 1912–13 season and remained there until 1920, playing just three seasons during this time due to the outbreak of the First World War when league football was abandoned. In 1920, they were elected to The Football League, joining the Second Division for one season, winning promotion in their first season after finishing second. The club also competed regularly in the Welsh Cup, winning the trophy 22 times during their history, second only to Wrexham's 23, before they were denied entrance into the competition from 1995 onward by the Football Association of Wales, along with all other clubs playing in the English league pyramid.

The following decade is regarded as the most successful in the club's history as they finished second during the 1923–24 season, losing out on winning the league title on the goal average system used at the time to Huddersfield Town. During this period, they reached two FA Cup finals, losing 1–0 to Sheffield United in 1925 before returning to the final two years later, beating Arsenal 1–0 at Wembley Stadium in 1927. They also won the FA Charity Shield after beating amateur side Corinthians 2–1. Cardiff remain the only non-English side to have ever won the FA Cup or FA Charity Shield.

Cardiff were relegated for the first time in their history in 1929 and entered a period of decline, dropping into the third tier two years later. The club did manage to return to the top tier in 1952, but their relegation in 1962 led to a decline in the club's fortunes that saw them outside the top division for 51 years, the longest absence in the club's history, not returning until 2013. Relegation from Division Two in the 1984–85 season saw the club enter a downward period that culminated with their joint lowest ever finish in the Football League, 22nd in the fourth tier in the 1995–96 season.

In 2000, the club was purchased by Lebanese businessman Sam Hammam, who invested money into the side and saw them rise from the fourth tier to the second tier in just three seasons. Although Hammam left the club in 2006, they continued their progress, reaching the Football League Championship play-offs for three consecutive seasons between 2009 and 2012, suffering defeat on all three occasions. The following season, under the ownership of new owner Vincent Tan, they finished first in the Championship, winning promotion back into the top tier for the first time since 1962. However, they suffered relegation in their only season and returned to the Championship.

As of the end of the 2021–22 season, the club had spent 17 seasons in the top tier of English football, 48 in the second, 20 in the third and 10 in the fourth. This list details their achievements in first-team competitions, and records their top goalscorer, for each completed season since their first appearance in the English football pyramid as members of the Southern Football League in 1910–11. Due to the unavailability of complete statistics, seasons prior to 1910 in the amateur Welsh leagues are not included.

Key

Key to league record:
Pld = Matches played
W = Matches won
D = Matches drawn
L = Matches lost
GF = Goals for
GA = Goals against
Pts = Points
Pos = Final position

Key to divisions:
SL Div 1 = Southern Football League First Division
SL Div 2 = Southern Football League Second Division
Div 1 = Football League First Division
Div 2 = Football League Second Division
Div 3 = Football League Third Division
Div 4 = Football League Fourth Division
Champ = EFL Championship
Prem = Premier League

Key to rounds:
GS = Group Stages
QR = Qualifying round
R1 = Round 1
R2 = Round 2
R3 = Round 3
R4 = Round 4
R5 = Round 5
QF = Quarter-finals 
SF = Semi-finals
RU = Runners-up
W = Winners

Key to colours and symbols:

Seasons

Notes

References

General

Specific

 

Seasons
 
Cardiff City